Kiara College is an Independent public co-educational  high day school, located in the Perth suburb of Kiara, Western Australia

History
Kiara College was established in 1974 as Lockridge High School. By 1979, the school was renamed to Lockridge Senior High School. In 2015, the school was renamed to Kiara College, and that same year it became an Independent Public School.

Future
A $20.7 million upgrade is set to start construction in October 2020, which includes a performing arts centre, covered outdoor sports courts, new carpark and refurbishments to existing buildings.

Programs
Kiara College has Department of Education endorsed specialist programs in agriculture and basketball.

Agriculture
Kiara College has a 27 hectare, fully functioning farm on site. Students in the Agriculture Specialist Program learn about cattle, pigs, sheep, horticulture, aquaculture and poultry. Primary schools students can go on excursions to the Kiara College farm as a part of the school's Agricultural Awareness Program.

Basketball
The basketball specialist programs allows students to develop their skills in playing, coaching and refereeing basketball. Students in the program participate in it for 4 hours per week. Students can take part in the college basketball team and participate in school-based competitions. Year 11's and 12's have an opportunity to attain their Level 1 Referee Certificate and complete a first aid qualification. Students can also do a Certificate II in Sport Coaching.

Local intake area
Kiara College's local intake area covers Beechboro, Bennett Springs, part of Brabham, Caversham, Dayton, part of Eden Hill, part of Kiara and West Swan. Students living in the local intake area have a guaranteed place at the school if they apply. Students living outside the local intake area may join the school if they are accepted into one of the specialist programs or after being judged on a case-by-case basis.

Academic results

Due to the low number of students completing ATAR, median ATARs have not been published recently.

Student numbers

Notable alumni

Des Headland – Former AFL footballer for Brisbane and Fremantle, premiership player for the Brisbane Lions
Colin Holt – National Party politician
Sharryn Jackson – Labor Party politician

See also

 List of schools in the Perth metropolitan area

References

Public high schools in Perth, Western Australia
Educational institutions established in 1974
1974 establishments in Australia